Khapa is a city and a municipal council in Nagpur district in the Indian state of Maharashtra.

Geography
It has an average elevation of 274 metres (898 feet).

Demographics
 India census, Khapa had a population of 14,972. Males constitute 51% of the population and females 49%. Khapa has an average literacy rate of 72%, higher than the national average of 59.5%: male literacy is 80%, and female literacy is 64%. In Khapa, 12% of the population is under 6 years of age.
Khapa is based on Kanhan River.

References

Cities and towns in Nagpur district